Wayne Campbell Sutton (November 6, 1890 – November 1976) was an American college football player and coach. He served as the head coach at Louisiana State University (LSU) for the 1917 season, compiling a record of 3–5. In 1946 Sutton was by appointed Monrad Wallgren, Governors of Washington, to the state's horse racing commission.

Head coaching record

References

External links
 

1890 births
1976 deaths
LSU Tigers football coaches
Washington Huskies football coaches
Washington Huskies football players
People in horse racing
People from Montesano, Washington